A pylon is a monumental gate of an Egyptian temple (Egyptian: bxn.t in the Manuel de Codage transliteration). The word comes from the Greek term  'gate'. It consists of two pyramidal towers, each tapered and surmounted by a cornice, joined by a less elevated section enclosing the entrance between them. The gate was generally about half the height of the towers. Contemporary paintings of pylons show them with long poles flying banners.

Egyptian architecture
 
In ancient Egyptian religion, the pylon mirrored the hieroglyph akhet 'horizon', which was a depiction of two hills "between which the sun rose and set". Consequently, it played a critical role in the symbolic architecture of a building associated with the place of re-creation and rebirth.

Pylons were often decorated with scenes emphasizing a king's authority since it was the public face of a building. On the first pylon of the temple of Isis at Philae, the pharaoh is shown slaying his enemies while Isis, Horus and Hathor look on. Other examples of pylons can be seen in Karnak, Luxor Temple and Edfu. Rituals to the god Amun were often carried out on the top of temple pylons. A pair of obelisks usually stood in front of a pylon.

In addition to standard vertical grooves on the exterior face of a pylon wall which were designed to hold flag poles, some pylons also contained internal stairways and rooms. The oldest intact pylons belong to mortuary temples from the Ramesside period in the 13th and 12th centuries BCE.

Revival architecture

Both Neoclassical and Egyptian Revival architecture employ the pylon form, with Boodle's gentlemen's club in London being an example of the Neoclassical style. 

The 19th and 20th centuries saw pylon architecture employed for bridges such as the Sydney Harbour Bridge and as stand-alone monuments such as the Patcham Pylon in Brighton and Hove, England.

Gallery

See also
 Ancient Egyptian architecture

References

External links
 

Architectural elements
Gates